In mathematics, Pfaffian functions are a certain class of functions whose derivative can be written in terms of the original function. They were originally introduced by Askold Khovanskii in the 1970s, but are named after German mathematician Johann Pfaff.

Basic definition
Some functions, when differentiated, give a result which can be written in terms of the original function.  Perhaps the simplest example is the exponential function, f(x) = ex.  If we differentiate this function we get ex again, that is

Another example of a function like this is the reciprocal function, g(x) = 1/x.  If we differentiate this function we will see that

Other functions may not have the above property, but their derivative may be written in terms of functions like those above.  For example, if we take the function h(x) = ex log(x) then we see

Functions like these form the links in a so-called Pfaffian chain.  Such a chain is a sequence of functions, say f1, f2, f3, etc., with the property that if we differentiate any of the functions in this chain then the result can be written in terms of the function itself and all the functions preceding it in the chain (specifically as a polynomial in those functions and the variables involved).  So with the functions above we have that f, g, h is a Pfaffian chain.

A Pfaffian function is then just a polynomial in the functions appearing in a Pfaffian chain and the function argument.  So with the Pfaffian chain just mentioned, functions such as F(x) = x3f(x)2 − 2g(x)h(x) are Pfaffian.

Rigorous definition

Let U be an open domain in Rn.  A Pfaffian chain of order r ≥ 0 and degree α ≥ 1 in U is a sequence of real analytic functions  f1,..., fr in U satisfying differential equations

for i = 1, ..., r where Pi, j ∈ R[x1, ..., xn, y1, ..., yi] are polynomials of degree ≤ α.  A function f on U is called a Pfaffian function of order r and degree (α, β) if

where P ∈ R[x1, ..., xn, y1, ..., yr] is a polynomial of degree at most β ≥ 1.  The numbers r, α, and β are collectively known as the format of the Pfaffian function, and give a useful measure of its complexity.

Examples

 The most trivial examples of Pfaffian functions are the polynomials in R[X].  Such a function will be a polynomial in a Pfaffian chain of order r = 0, that is the chain with no functions.  Such a function will have α = 0 and β equal to the degree of the polynomial.
 Perhaps the simplest nontrivial Pfaffian function  is f(x) = ex.  This is Pfaffian with order r = 1 and α = β = 1 due to the equation f = f.
 Inductively, one may define f1(x) = exp(x) and fm+1(x) = exp(fm(x)) for 1 ≤ m < r.  Then fm′ = f1f2···fm.  So this is a Pfaffian chain of order r and degree α = r.
 All of the algebraic functions are Pfaffian on suitable domains, as are the hyperbolic functions.  The trigonometric functions on bounded intervals are Pfaffian, but they must be formed indirectly.  For example, the function cos(x) is a polynomial in the Pfaffian chain tan(x/2), cos2(x/2) on the interval (−π, π).
 In fact all the elementary functions and Liouvillian functions are Pfaffian.

In model theory

Consider the structure R = (R, +, −, ·, <, 0, 1), the ordered field of real numbers.  In the 1960s Andrei Gabrielov proved that the structure obtained by starting with R and adding a function symbol for every analytic function restricted to the unit box [0, 1]m is model complete.  That is, any set definable in this structure Ran was just the projection of some higher-dimensional set defined by identities and inequalities involving these restricted analytic functions.

In the 1990s, Alex Wilkie showed that one has the same result if instead of adding every restricted analytic function, one just adds the unrestricted exponential function to R to get the ordered real field with exponentiation, Rexp, a result known as Wilkie's theorem.  Wilkie also tackled the question of which finite sets of analytic functions could be added to R to get a model-completeness result.  It turned out that adding any Pfaffian chain restricted to the box [0, 1]m would give the same result.  In particular one may add all Pfaffian functions to R to get the structure RPfaff as a variant of Gabrielov's result. The result on exponentiation is not a special case of this result (even though exp is a Pfaffian chain by itself), as it applies to the unrestricted exponential function.

This result of Wilkie's proved that the structure RPfaff is an o-minimal structure.

Noetherian functions

The equations above that define a Pfaffian chain are said to satisfy a triangular condition, since the derivative of each successive function in the chain is a polynomial in one extra variable.  Thus if they are written out in turn a triangular shape appears:

and so on.  If this triangularity condition is relaxed so that the derivative of each function in the chain is a polynomial in all the other functions in the chain, then the chain of functions is known as a Noetherian chain, and a function constructed as a polynomial in this chain is called a Noetherian function.  So, for example, a Noetherian chain of order three is composed of three functions f1, f2, f3, satisfying the equations

The name stems from the fact that the ring generated by the functions in such a chain is Noetherian.

Any Pfaffian chain is also a Noetherian chain; the extra variables in each polynomial are simply redundant in this case.  But not every Noetherian chain is Pfaffian; for example, if we take f1(x) = sin(x) and f2(x) = cos(x) then we have the equations

and these hold for all real numbers x, so f1, f2 is a Noetherian chain on all of R.  But there is no polynomial P(x, y) such that the derivative of sin(x) can be written as P(x, sin(x)), and so this chain is not Pfaffian.

Notes

References

Functions and mappings
Types of functions